Interstate 75 (I-75) runs from Cincinnati to Toledo by way of Dayton in the US state of Ohio. The highway enters the state running concurrently with I-71 from Kentucky on the Brent Spence Bridge over the Ohio River and into the Bluegrass region. I-75 continues along the Mill Creek Expressway northward to the Butler County line just north of I-275. From there, the freeway runs into the Miami Valley and then passes through the Great Black Swamp before crossing into Michigan.

Route description

The highway enters the state via the Brent Spence Bridge into Downtown Cincinnati. I-71 immediately splits off to the east from this point, taking a more easterly route through downtown, while I-75 continues north along the west side of downtown. The Mill Creek Expressway is a heavily trafficked portion of I-75 in Ohio, from the Ohio River at the Kentucky state line to Butler County in Cincinnati's northern suburbs that follows the path of its namesake, Mill Creek, and the former path of the Miami and Erie Canal, and passes through the city's industrial core.

The highway continues north, intersecting I-74 and turning to the northeast. At one point, while passing through the suburb of Arlington Heights, the carriageways split apart and create a wide enough space for the community to be completely enclosed by the Interstate; they rejoin at the other end of the community. The highway then intersects the Cincinnati beltway, I-275, and continues northeasterly through the West Chester Township, Monroe, Middletown, and Franklin en route to the Dayton metropolitan area.

Once arriving in the Dayton area, I-75 first junctions with I-675, an eastern bypass of Dayton, in Miamisburg. The highway then continues north into Downtown Dayton, skirting it to the west and junctioning with I-70 near the Dayton International Airport.

The highway then continues north through the western side of the state toward Toledo, passing through cities such as Troy, Piqua, Lima, Findlay, and Bowling Green. Once the highway arrives in Toledo, it first intersects with I-475 in Perrysburg, followed by I-80/I-90 (Ohio Turnpike) in Rossford before skirting Downtown Toledo to the west. After the interchange, I-75 continues north into Downtown Toledo. Just north of downtown, I-475 rejoins I-75. After continuing northeasterly, I-75 intersects I-280, which connects the Ohio Turnpike. Following this, I-75 enters Michigan and follows the shore of Lake Erie.

History
I-75 in Ohio was built through the 1960s, supplanting U.S. Route 25 (US 25), though much of the freeway was built for US 25. By the time I-75 was finished, US 25 ran concurrently with I-75 for all but the northernmost section. By 1974, the US 25 designation was deemed unnecessary and removed from Ohio and Michigan. The northernmost section of US 25 in Ohio became State Route 25 (SR 25).

In 2005, the Ohio Department of Transportation (ODOT) considered reconfiguring I-75's existing interchange in Findlay with US 224 and SR 15 west as a diverging diamond interchange (DDI) to improve traffic flow. Had it been constructed, it would have been the first such interchange in the US. By 2006, ODOT had reconsidered, instead adding lanes to the existing overpass.

Traffic congestion in the Cincinnati–Dayton corridor has led to proposals for a regional I-75 bypass to divert through traffic.

The segment from West Chester to Middletown was widened in 2010.  Construction on the highway continues from Middletown all the way to I-675.

In Dayton, ODOT recently completed total reconfiguration of I-75 with several projects occurring simultaneously. The intersection of I-75 and I-70 was reconfigured to handle an increased traffic load at the intersection. I-75 through Downtown Dayton at the intersections of SR 4, US 35, and between were widened and modernized.

ODOT between 2014 and 2016 completed a widening project between I-475 in Perrysburg and SR 15 in Findlay to add a third lane in each direction. The SR 15 interchange (which also features the north end of US 68) was subsequently rebuilt as well. Several miles north of the southerly I-475 junction, I-75 intersects with I-80/I-90 (Ohio Turnpike).

Work began in May 2019 to convert the existing interchange with Union Centre Boulevard in West Chester Township, Butler County, to a DDI. The $20-million project was completed in mid-2020.

Mill Creek Expressway
The Mill Creek Expressway generally follows the old Miami and Erie Canal, which extended from Cincinnati to Toledo via Dayton, itself built in the Mill Creek valley near Cincinnati. The canal extended from the Ohio River along the present locations of Eggleston Avenue and Central Parkway to Mount Storm Park and continued north, remaining close to the Mill Creek Expressway to Butler County. 

The first portion of the expressway was built by the Works Progress Administration (WPA) in 1941—during World War II—to serve the Wright Aeronautical plant in Lockland. Known then as the Wright Highway, it was initially planned to run from Paddock Road (SR 4) in Carthage north to Cincinnati-Dayton Road (then US 25) near Maud but was only built—almost completely along the old canal—between Galbraith Road and Glendale-Milford Road (then SR 126). A short extension was built south to Towne Street in Elmwood Place in the late 1940s.

In 1960, plans were announced to add an eastern portion that would result in Arlington Heights being surrounded on both sides by the highway.

On January 19, 2015, an overpass north of Hopple Street collapsed onto the highway below at approximately 10:30 pm. The span that failed was the segment of the former northbound ramp to Hopple Street that passed over the southbound lanes of I-75. The overpass had been closed and was in the process of being removed after a replacement ramp was opened on December 26, 2014. The Interstate underneath was open at the time of the failure. One construction worker on the overpass was killed during the collapse by a falling steel beam. A truck driver was injured when their semi hit the fallen overpass immediately after the collapse. One other worker was in a backhoe on the bridge but was uninjured.

Future
There are plans to convert the existing interchange with SR 725 in Miamisburg to a DDI. The project will not be built until 2023 and its projected cost is $4.1 million, entirely funded by the state.

The Brent Spence Bridge Corridor project will replace the Brent Spence Bridge and continue north to the Western Hills Viaduct. The Mill Creek Expressway project will modernize the Mill Creek Expressway segment of the highway, from the Western Hills Viaduct to the Ronald Reagan Cross County Highway interchange. The Thru the Valley project will continue from the Cross County Highway north to I-275. These projects will improve safety by eliminating all left-hand exit ramps and increasing vehicular capacity.

Exit list

 exit connected to CR 109

Auxiliary routes
I-75 in Ohio has three auxiliary routes. The southernmost is I-275, which serves as a full loop around Cincinnati, including segments that extend into Indiana and Kentucky. The third auxiliary route is I-675
bypassing Dayton to the south and east and connecting to I-70 northeast of the city.

In addition to these auxiliary routes, there are three business routes of I-75. These run along former segments of US 25, I-75's predecessor highway. They connect to the downtowns of Troy and Piqua; Sidney; and Findlay.

See also

Notes

References

External links

 Ohio
75
Interstate 75
Interstate 75
Interstate 75
Fairfield, Ohio
Transportation in Hamilton County, Ohio
Transportation in Butler County, Ohio
Transportation in Warren County, Ohio
Transportation in Montgomery County, Ohio
Transportation in Miami County, Ohio
Transportation in Shelby County, Ohio
Transportation in Auglaize County, Ohio
Transportation in Allen County, Ohio
Transportation in Hancock County, Ohio
Transportation in Wood County, Ohio
Transportation in Lucas County, Ohio